Let's Get Together is the seventeenth studio album by American country music singer-songwriter Tammy Wynette. It was released on May 30, 1977, by Epic Records.

Commercial performance 
The album peaked at No. 19 on the Billboard Country Albums chart. The album's only single, "Let's Get Together (One Last Time)", peaked at No. 6 on the Billboard Country Singles chart.

Track listing

Personnel
Adapted from the album liner notes.
Bill Barnes - photography, album design
Lou Bradley - engineer
The Jordanaires - backing vocals
Bill McElhiney - string arrangement
The Nashville Edition - backing vocals
Cheryl Pardue - album design
Billy Sherrill - producer
Bergen White - string arrangement
Tammy Wynette - lead vocals

Chart positions

Album

Singles

References

1977 albums
Tammy Wynette albums
Epic Records albums
Albums produced by Billy Sherrill